Born in 1957 in Kasese District, Western Uganda, Jackson Nzerebende Tembo become an Anglican bishop in Uganda: He was Bishop of South Rwenzori from 2003 to 2020. Before becoming Bishop, he served in several capacities as a church lay reader and priest within the diocese.

References

Anglican bishops of South Rwenzori
Uganda Christian University alumni
21st-century Anglican bishops in Uganda